The Coaque River is a river in the Manabí Province of Ecuador.

Course

The sources of the Coaque River are in the Bilsa Biological Station in the Mache-Chindul Ecological Reserve.
The river enters the Pacific Ocean at coordinates , to the south of Pedernales.

Channel maintenance

In the winter season of March 2012 landslides in Piedra Maluca deposited large amounts of mud in the river, which created a dyke in the river and caused floods affecting several houses.
Roads were closed in the communities of Coaque, Quiauque Abajo, Medio, Arriba, Colisa and La Playa due to the risk of further flooding.
Dozens of police and military were deployed to enforce the closure.
The Equitesa company was given responsibility for getting the water flowing again.

In February 2013 it was reported that Equitesa, which was building the road from Pedernales to San Vicente, had been mechanically excavating material from the river, apparently without a permit.
The excavations had in fact been authorized by a contract signed by the National Water Secretariat on 9 October 2012 to divert a section of the river and avoid future mudslides.
The National Water Secretariat was continuing to widen the river bed, and would remove another .

Irrigation project

In 2013 the Spanish company Inassa was undertaking a feasibility study for the National Water Secretariat (Senagua) on the multi-purpose Coaque project in Pedernales.
The project will develop the Coaque and Tachina river basins, and will include a diversion dam,  canal and a system to irrigate  of land. It would also provide drinking water.
60,000 citizens of the Pedernales canton of Manabí would benefit from the project.

See also
List of rivers of Ecuador

References

Sources

Rivers of Ecuador
Geography of Manabí Province